Hans Lissmann may refer to:
 Hans Lissmann (zoologist)
 Hans Lissmann (tenor)